The new National Council of Slovakia will be inaugurated after the March 2016 parliamentary election and consisted of 150 representatives elected from party lists.

Parliamentary officials
Officials of the new National Council will be elected at the inaugural session.

Composition
On the basis of the parliamentary election of 2016, the composition of the National Council  is as follows.

By political party

MPs by party

Changes 
Note that a number of MPs who are high-ranking members of parties in the ruling coalition were subsequently appointed to various ministerial and governmental positions. In such cases they are required by Slovakian law to put their parliamentary mandate on hold. Those replacements are documented above. The changes which resulted into club changes or occurred after the inauguration of the new government are shown here as well.

References

 List of elected members from the official election site

2016